Jordi Burillo Puig (born 7 December 1972) is a retired tennis player from Spain. He won one singles title and a doubles title on the ATP Tour in his career. His style was very aggressive and powerful, hitting always the ball and serving very hard.

He won the title in Bologna and played the final of Florence in 1993. In 1995, he played his last final of ATP level until his retirement, in Palermo. In 1997, Burillo won the Open Castilla y León, considered best Challenger of the world by this date. And, this year, the court was so fast (and consequently his game, and his hits) that only Francisco Clavet (semifinals) could end his match against Burillo. All his other rivals in the tournament gave up due to injuries.

His more notable victories include Boris Becker (1992, clay) and Mark Philippoussis (1998, grass). After retiring from professional tennis, he became Julián Alonso's coach.

ATP career finals

Singles: 3 (1 title, 2 runner-ups)

Doubles: 3 (1 title, 2 runner-ups)

Notes

References

External links
 
 
 

1972 births
Living people
Tennis players from Catalonia
People from Mataró
Sportspeople from the Province of Barcelona
Spanish male tennis players
Spanish tennis coaches
Tennis players from Barcelona
Mediterranean Games silver medalists for Spain
Mediterranean Games medalists in tennis
Competitors at the 1993 Mediterranean Games